The England women's cricket team represents England in international women's cricket. They first competed in international cricket in 1934–35, when they played against Australia, contesting three Test matches. Their next officially recognised series was against New Zealand in 1971–72. They received their first Test defeat when they lost to Australia in 1937, and their first Test series lost was in 1949, when the team lost the women's Ashes to Australia with one loss and two draws. The team played its first One Day International (ODI) match against the International XI in the 1973 Women's Cricket World Cup; England won the match by 135 runs. The team won the 1973, 1993, 2009 and 2017 editions of the women's Cricket World Cup. England have played 91 Test matches, 359 ODI matches and 155 Twenty20 Internationals since their first such contest in 2004.

England have only played five different sides in Test cricket, with their most frequent opponent being Australia, against whom England have contested 47 Tests. The only sides that have beaten England in Test cricket are Australia and India. England have similarly faced Australia more times than any other team in ODI cricket, playing 78 matches; and Australia have recorded the most victories against England, beating them 52 times. England have beaten New Zealand more times than any other country, triumphing on 40 occasions against them. In Twenty20 Internationals, England have played more matches against Australia and New Zealand than any other countries, facing them 37 and 28 times respectively. They have recorded the most victories against New Zealand, beating them in 22 matches.

Key

Test cricket

One Day International

Twenty20 International

References

Note

Cricket records and statistics
England women's national cricket team